The 1896 Indiana State Sycamores football team represented Indiana State University in the 1896 college football season.  This was the inaugural team for the university and played one game, versus Terre Haute High School; later Terre Haute William Wiley High.  Few to no records remain, though it is known the Sycamores lost to the High Schoolers.  The coach is unknown and the only player known is Lotus Coffman, future college president.

The Sycamores would ultimately face Terre Haute High a total of seven times between 1896-1902, achieving a record of 1-2-3 (.417) and one unknown outcome.

Schedule

References

Indiana State
Indiana State Sycamores football seasons
Indiana State Sycamores football